Marc-André Kruska (born 29 June 1987) is a German professional footballer who played as a midfielder. He works as assistant manager of VfL Bochum's U19 squad.

Career
Born in Castrop-Rauxel, North Rhine-Westphalia, Kruska started his career at SC Arminia Ickern and soon signed for VfR Rauxel 08, the team from his native village. In 1999, age 12, he was spotted by Borussia Dortmund and at the Westfalen Stadium he enjoyed his further training. Just 17, he made his debut in the first team against Kaiserslautern in 2004–05. On the final match day of that season, he scored his first goal against Hansa Rostock, making him the fourth youngest scorer ever in the history of the Bundesliga. As the best U18 player, he was also awarded the "Fritz Walter Medal".

The three following seasons confirmed his place in the starting line-up as defensive midfielder, bringing his total number of Bundesliga games to 98. After a half year and fifteen games in the Jupiler League for Club Brugge, he returned to Germany signing a three-year contract with FC Energie Cottbus on 28 July 2009.

On 3 January 2014, he joined FSV Frankfurt.

In January 2018, Kruska left SC Paderborn 07 for league rivals Werder Bremen II. In May, following Werder Bremen II's relegation from the 3. Liga, it was announced Kruska would be one of ten players to leave the club.

In June 2018, Kruska joined reigning Luxembourg champions F91 Dudelange. He retired after the 2018–19 season.

Later career
Following his retirement as a player, Kruska became assistant coach of a VfL Bochum's U19 squad. Beside that, he joined FC Frohlinde as a player.

Honours
Borussia Dortmund
 DFB-Pokal runner-up: 2007–08

Individual
 Fritz-Walter-Medal 2005 in Gold (Category U18)

References

External links
 
 
 

1987 births
Living people
People from Castrop-Rauxel
Sportspeople from Münster (region)
Association football midfielders
German footballers
Bundesliga players
2. Bundesliga players
3. Liga players
Belgian Pro League players
Borussia Dortmund players
Borussia Dortmund II players
Club Brugge KV players
FC Energie Cottbus players
FSV Frankfurt players
SC Paderborn 07 players
SV Werder Bremen II players
F91 Dudelange players
Expatriate footballers in Belgium
German expatriate footballers
Germany under-21 international footballers
Footballers from North Rhine-Westphalia